Volume 3: Further in Time is the third studio album from Afro Celt Sound System, released on 19 June 2001 through Real World.

Background
The album features N'Faly Kouyate in a more prominent role as a main contributor, a deliberate choice, as James McNally explained: "We felt the last album's African element wasn't as strong as it could have been. N'Faly had become a new member, and that was his first album. This time, he's much closer to the way we work and brought much more to the table than we could have ever imagined."

Release
A video clip for the official single "When You're Falling" with an appearance of Peter Gabriel was directed by Adam Berg and released in July 2001. The single contains a dance-oriented remix by Adam Wren of Leftfield and Dom Morley. After the single had received worldwide attention, the song "Life Begin Again" was made available as promotional single in 2002.

Real World issued a limited edition version of the album with an additional CD that contains a remix of the song "Eireann" from the predecessor album and a live version of the track "Mandrake". This edition was sold exclusively through retailer Borders Books & Music. Afro Celt Sound System made the whole album available for streaming on their website.

Critical reception
The album was nominated for Best Global Music Album at the 44th Annual Grammy Awards in 2002.

Track listing

Personnel

Afro Celt Sound System
 Simon Emmerson – guitars, bouzouki, mandolin, drum programming
 James McNally – high and low whistles, accordion, harmonium, piano, keyboards, bodhran, drum & keyboard programming
 Iarla Ó Lionáird – vocals
 Martin Russell – keyboards, programming, "front of house" live sound
 N'Faly Kouyate – vocals, kora, balafon (3–12)
 Johnny Kalsi – dhol drums, tabla, "Kalsi kit" (1–11)
 Emer Mayock – uilleann pipes (1, 2, 4, 8, 11), flute (11)
 Demba "Shadowman" Barry – vocals (6), dancing
 Moussa Sissokho – talking drum, djembe
 Simon "Mass" Massey – drum and keyboard programming (1–11)

Additional musicians
 Nawazish Ali Khan – violin (1, 6, 7)
 Nigel Eaton – hurdy-gurdy (1, 7)
 John Fortis – bass (3, 10)
 Peter Gabriel – vocals, keyboards (3)
 Sunil Kalyan – tabla (5, 9, 11)
 Pina Kollars – vocals (9)
 Pete Lockett – percussion (1, 2, 4, 5, 7–9, 11)
 Mairéad Ní Mhaonaigh – fiddle (4)
 Julie Murphy – vocals (7)
 Myrdhin – Celtic harp (8, 11, 12)
 Liam O'Flynn – uilleann pipes (9)
 Robert Plant – vocals (7)
 Hossam Ramzy – percussion (1–11)
 Screaming Orphans – vocals (3, 6, 8, 9, 12)
 Ciarán Tourish – fiddle (4)
 Rosie Wetters – solo cello (7)
 Wired Strings – strings (5, 9)

Charts

References

Further in Time
Further in Time
Real World Records albums
Albums produced by Stephen Hague
Sequel albums